Bradley Hills Presbyterian Church is a Presbyterian Church located at 6601 Bradley Boulevard in Bethesda, Maryland.  The church has a unique partnership with the Bethesda Jewish Congregation (BJC), in which they share the same space for worship. It is believed that this arrangement, which is 46 years old (as of June 20, 2008), is the oldest such relationship in the United States.

In 1998 the BJC and Bradley Hills Presbyterian Church signed a pact, which reads: 
We wish to acknowledge and celebrate commonalities and differences. We see this relationship as a living example of understanding and respect among people of different heritage.

References

External links
Bradley Hills Presbyterian Church website

Presbyterian churches in Maryland
Buildings and structures in Bethesda, Maryland
Churches in Montgomery County, Maryland
Bethesda Jewish Congregation